This is a list of the Australian moth species of the family Geometridae. It also acts as an index to the species articles and forms part of the full List of moths of Australia.

Subfamily Archiearinae
Acalyphes philorites Turner, 1926
Dirce aesiodora Turner, 1922
Dirce lunaris (Meyrick, 1890)
Dirce oriplancta Turner, 1926
Dirce solaris (Meyrick, 1890)

Subfamily Ennominae

Abraxini
Abraxas expectata Warren, 1902
Abraxas flavimacula (Warren, 1896)
Abraxas sporocrossa Turner, 1922

Baptini
Borbacha euchrysa (Lower, 1894)
Bulonga distans Warren, 1896
Eurychoria fictilis (Turner, 1919)
Eurychoria gerasphora (Turner, 1947)
Synegia aurantiaca (Warren, 1897)

Boarmiini
Amblychia angeronaria Guenée, 1857
Amblychia subrubida (Warren, 1896)
Amraica debrunnescens (L.B. Prout, 1926)
Apheloceros dasciodes Turner, 1947
Ateloptila confusa Warren, 1900
Bracca matutinata (Walker, 1862)
Bracca ribbei (Pagenstecher, 1886)
Bracca rosenbergi (Pagenstecher, 1886)
Bracca rotundata (Butler, 1877)
Catoria camelaria (Guenée, 1857)
Catoria delectaria (Walker, 1866)
Catoria hemiprosopa (Turner, 1904)
Chorodna strixaria (Guenée, 1857)
Cleora costiplaga (D.S. Fletcher, 1953)
Cleora decisaria (Walker, 1866)
Cleora displicata (Walker, 1860)
Cleora eugraphica (Turner, 1917)
Cleora godeffroyi (Butler, 1886)
Cleora goldfinchi L.B. Prout, 1937
Cleora illustraria (Walker, 1863)
Cleora injectaria (Walker, 1860)
Cleora lacteata (Warren, 1897)
Cleora perfumosa (Warren, 1896)
Cleora perlepidaria (Warren, 1900)
Cleora repetita (Butler, 1882)
Cleora rostrata (D.S. Fletcher, 1953)
Cleora sabulata (D.S. Fletcher, 1953)
Cleora tenebrata (D.S. Fletcher, 1953)
Craspedosis leucosticta Warren, 1896
Didymoctenia exsuperata (Walker, 1860)
Ectropis aganopa (Meyrick, 1892)
Ectropis argalea Meyrick, 1892
Ectropis bhurmitra (Walker, 1860)
Ectropis bispinaria (Guenée, 1857)
Ectropis calida Goldfinch, 1944
Ectropis despicata (Walker, 1860)
Ectropis excursaria (Guenée, 1857)
Ectropis fractaria (Guenée, 1857)
Ectropis gravis (Turner, 1947)
Ectropis lignea Goldfinch, 1944
Ectropis mniara Turner, 1917
Ectropis petrozona (Lower, 1900)
Euphronarcha epiphloea (Turner, 1926)
Euphronarcha leptodesma (Meyrick, 1892)
Euphronarcha luxaria (Guenée, 1857)
Gastrinodes argoplaca (Meyrick, 1892)
Gastrinodes bitaeniaria (Le Guillou, 1841)
Heterogena exitela Turner, 1947
Hyposidra incomptaria (Walker, 1866)
Hyposidra janiaria Guenée, 1857
Hyposidra talaca (Walker, 1860)
Iulotrichia semiumbrata (Warren, 1896)
Krananda extranotata L.B. Prout, 1926
Lipogya capnota (Meyrick, 1892)
Lipogya eutheta (Turner, 1917)
Lipogya exprimataria (Walker, 1863)
Lipogya leucoprosopa (Turner, 1947)
Milionia aetheria (Turner, 1947)
Milionia queenslandica Jordan & Rothschild, 1895
Neogyne elongata Warren, 1898
Neogyne mochlosema (Turner, 1917)
Pachyplocia atmocyma (Turner, 1917)
Pachyplocia griseata Warren, 1896
Pachyplocia loxocyma (Turner, 1917)
Pachyplocia prionodes (Turner, 1947)
Paradromulia ambigua Warren, 1896
Phelotis cognata (Walker, 1860)
Pholodes sinistraria (Guenée, 1857)
Pleurolopha nebridota Turner, 1904
Polyacme dissimilis (Warren, 1897)
Polyacme subpulchra (Warren, 1897)
Praesos mariana (White, 1852)
Psilalcis isombra (Meyrick, 1892)
Psilosticha absorpta (Walker, 1860)
Psilosticha attacta (Walker, 1860)
Psilosticha loxoschema (Turner, 1947)
Psilosticha mactaria (Guenée, 1857)
Psilosticha oresitropha Turner, 1947
Psilosticha pristis (Meyrick, 1892)
Racotis maculata (T.P. Lucas, 1890)
Scioglyptis canescaria (Guenée, 1857)
Scioglyptis chionomera (Lower, 1893)
Scioglyptis heterogyna (Lower, 1893)
Scioglyptis loxographa (Turner, 1917)
Scioglyptis lyciaria (Guenée, 1857)
Scioglyptis violescens (Warren, 1898)
Symmetroctena fumosa Warren, 1895
Syneora acclinis (Turner, 1947)
Syneora acrotypa (Turner, 1917)
Syneora adelphodes (Meyrick, 1892)
Syneora amphiclina (Meyrick, 1892)
Syneora cheleuta (Meyrick, 1892)
Syneora cymatomita (Turner, 1947)
Syneora emmelodes (Turner, 1904)
Syneora euboliaria (Walker, 1860)
Syneora excursaria (Walker, 1863)
Syneora fractata (Walker, 1862)
Syneora gypsochroa (Turner, 1947)
Syneora hemeropa (Meyrick, 1892)
Syneora leucanthes (Turner, 1947)
Syneora lithina (Warren, 1897)
Syneora mesochra (Turner, 1947)
Syneora mundifera (Walker, 1860)
Syneora nigrilinea Goldfinch, 1944
Syneora odontosticha (Turner, 1947)
Syneora praecisa (Turner, 1917)
Syneora silicaria (Guenée, 1857)
Syneora strixata (Walker, 1862)
Thallogama aellographa (Turner, 1947)
Thallogama corticola (Goldfinch, 1944)
Thallogama destinataria (Guenée, 1857)
Thallogama nigraria (R. Felder & Rogenhofer, 1875)
Thallogama pansticta (Turner, 1947)
Zermizinga sinuata (Warren, 1897)

The following species belong to the tribe Boarmiini, but have not been assigned to a genus yet. Given here is the original name given to the species when it was first described:
Aspilates pallidiscaria Walker, 1863
Boarmia atactopa Turner, 1947
Boarmia catephes Turner, 1947
Boarmia conspersa Turner, 1947
Boarmia crimnodes Turner, 1917
Boarmia driophila Goldfinch, 1944
Boarmia epiconia Turner, 1926
Boarmia odontocrossa Turner, 1947
Boarmia panconita Turner, 1917
Boarmia phloeopa Turner, 1947
Boarmia phricomita Turner, 1947
Boarmia pissinopa Turner, 1922
Boarmia platyleuca Turner, 1947
Boarmia polysticta Turner, 1947
Boarmia proschora Turner, 1926
Boarmia suasaria Guenée, 1857
Boarmia taeniota Turner, 1917
Boarmia zaloschema Turner, 1917
Cleora nesiotis Turner, 1926
Diastictis cremnodes Lower, 1893
Diastictis mesombra Lower, 1893
Ectropis fragilis Turner, 1947
Ectropis hieroglyphica Lower, 1900
Ectropis macariata Warren, 1897
Ectropis plectroneura Lower, 1900
Scioglyptis lithinopa Meyrick, 1892
Selidosema agoraea Meyrick, 1892
Selidosema leucoplecta Meyrick, 1892
Selidosema symmorpha Turner, 1904
Selidosema thermaea Meyrick, 1892
Selidosema zygophora Lower, 1893
Tephrosia curtaria Walker, 1866
Tephrosia desumpta Walker, 1860
Tephrosia exesaria Guenée, 1857
Tephrosia externaria Walker, 1866

Caberini
Casbia adoxa Turner, 1947
Casbia albinotata Warren, 1903
Casbia aviata (Walker, 1861)
Casbia calliorma Turner, 1919
Casbia catharodes (Turner, 1904)
Casbia celidosema Turner, 1947
Casbia coniodes Turner, 1947
Casbia crataea Turner, 1939
Casbia cremnias (Meyrick, 1892)
Casbia didymosticta Turner, 1947
Casbia eremias (Meyrick, 1892)
Casbia eutactopis Turner, 1947
Casbia farinalis (Rosenstock, 1885)
Casbia fasciata (Warren, 1896)
Casbia glaucochroa (Turner, 1906)
Casbia impressaria (Walker, 1861)
Casbia leptorrhoda Turner, 1947
Casbia lithodora (Meyrick, 1892)
Casbia melanops Rosenstock, 1885
Casbia ochthadia (Meyrick, 1892)
Casbia oenias (Meyrick, 1892)
Casbia pallens Turner, 1947
Casbia plinthodes Turner, 1947
Casbia rectaria Walker, 1866
Casbia rhodoptila Turner, 1919
Casbia rhodosceles Turner, 1939
Casbia scardamiata Warren, 1898
Casbia spodochroa (Turner, 1947)
Casbia synempora Turner, 1919
Casbia tanaoctena Turner, 1947
Hyperythra rubricata Warren, 1898
Laophila icasta (Turner, 1919)
Laophila isocyma (Meyrick, 1892)
Laophila modesta Swinhoe, 1902
Laophila odontocrossa (Turner, 1906)
Laophila sabulicolor (Turner, 1919)
Laophila sciara (Turner, 1947)
Laophila spodina (Meyrick, 1892)
Parametrodes dispar Warren, 1897
Petelia medardaria Herrich-Schäffer, 1856
Polycrasta cinereomarginata (Pagenstecher, 1888)
Rhinodia rostraria Guenée, 1857
Rhinodia undiferaria (Walker, 1866)

Cassymini
Cassephyra plenimargo (Warren, 1903)
Heterostegane insulata Warren, 1898
Iridobapta argostola Turner, 1919

Eutoeini
Luxiaria ochrophara (Turner, 1919)
Nadagarodes duplicipuncta Warren, 1899
Nadagarodes mysolata (Walker, 1866)
Probithia obstataria (Walker, 1861)
Probithia perichila (L.B. Prout, 1929)
Zeheba spectabilis (Butler, 1877)

Gonodontini
Gonodontis euctista (Turner, 1947)
Gonodontis fenestrata (T.P. Lucas, 1900)
Gonodontis luteola (Turner, 1904)
Gonodontis orthotoma (Lower, 1894)
Gonodontis stramenticea (Turner, 1947)
Proboloptera embolias Meyrick, 1892

Hypochrosini
Achrosis semifulva (Pagenstecher, 1886)
Capasa incensata (Walker, 1863)
Capasa recensata (L.B.Prout, 1925)
Corymica pryeri (Butler, 1878)
Ctimene flavannulata (Warren, 1899)

Lithinini
Idiodes apicata Guenée, 1857
Idiodes homophaea Turner, 1906
Idiodes idiocrossa (Turner, 1947)
Idiodes pellophanes (Turner, 1947)
Idiodes prionosema Turner, 1919
Idiodes rhacodes Turner, 1947
Idiodes siculoides (Walker, 1860)
Idiodes stictopleura Goldfinch, 1944
Idiodes tenuicorpis L.B. Prout, 1916
Nadagara irretracta Warren, 1899
Nadagara xylotrema (Lower, 1903)
Planolocha autoptis Meyrick, 1892
Planolocha hyposema Turner, 1947
Planolocha iogramma (Meyrick, 1897)
Planolocha obliquata (T.P. Lucas, 1892)
Urostola magica Meyrick, 1891

The following species belong to the tribe Lithinini, but have not been assigned to a genus yet. Given here is the original name given to the species when it was first described:
Azelina biplaga Walker, 1869
Diastictis goniota Lower, 1893
Gynopteryx ada Butler, 1882
Metrocampa celaenephes Turner, 1917
Picrophylla rubea Turner, 1947

Macariini
Discalma normata (Walker, 1861)
Dissomorphia australiaria (Guenée, 1857)
Godonela glareosa (Turner, 1917)
Godonela goldiei (H. Druce, 1882)
Godonela gratularia (Walker, 1861)
Godonela hypomochla (Turner, 1917)
Godonela margaritis (Meyrick, 1892)
Godonela tessellata (Warren, 1899)
Oxymacaria odontias (Lower, 1893)
Paramelora ammophila (Turner, 1947)
Paramelora lychnota (Lower, 1900)
Paramelora zophodesma Lower, 1903
Parosteodes fictiliaria (Guenée, 1857)

The following species belong to the tribe Macariini, but have not been assigned to a genus yet. Given here is the original name given to the species when it was first described:
Aspilates clarissa Butler, 1886
Selidosema penthearia Guenée, 1857

Nacophorini
Amelora acontistica (Turner, 1947)
Amelora adusta Turner, 1947
Amelora amblopa Guest, 1887
Amelora anepiscepta Turner, 1947
Amelora arotraea Meyrick, 1892
Amelora australis (Rosenstock, 1885)
Amelora belemnophora Turner, 1947
Amelora camptodes Turner, 1919
Amelora catacris Meyrick, 1892
Amelora ceraunia Turner, 1947
Amelora conia Turner, 1947
Amelora crenulata Turner, 1926
Amelora cryphia Turner, 1919
Amelora crypsigramma Lower, 1899
Amelora demistis Guest, 1887
Amelora fucosa Turner, 1919
Amelora goniota Guest, 1887
Amelora gonosemela (Lower, 1893)
Amelora idiomorpha Lower, 1893
Amelora leucaniata (Guenée, 1857)
Amelora lithopepla Lower, 1918
Amelora macarta Turner, 1919
Amelora mesocapna Turner, 1919
Amelora milvaria (Guenée, 1857)
Amelora newmannaria (Guenée, 1857)
Amelora oenobreches Turner, 1919
Amelora oncerodes Turner, 1919
Amelora oritropha Turner, 1919
Amelora pachyspila Turner, 1919
Amelora pentheres Turner, 1919
Amelora perinipha (Lower, 1915)
Amelora petrochroa (Lower, 1897)
Amelora polychroa Lower, 1907
Amelora sparsularia (Guenée, 1857)
Amelora suffusa Turner, 1926
Amelora synclera Turner, 1919
Amelora syscia (Turner, 1919)
Amelora thegalea Turner, 1947
Amelora zophopasta Turner, 1919
Amphiclasta lygaea Turner, 1906
Amphicrossa adelosticha (Turner, 1926)
Amphicrossa hemadelpha (Lower, 1897)
Aphantes melanochorda (Turner, 1919)
Aporoctena aprepes (Turner, 1904)
Aporoctena scierodes Meyrick, 1892
Archephanes zalosema Turner, 1926
Argidava subviduata Walker, 1863
Authaemon poliophara Turner, 1919
Authaemon purpurea Goldfinch, 1944
Authaemon stenonipha Turner, 1919
Bradyctena trychnoptila (Turner, 1906)
Capusa chionopleura Turner, 1926
Capusa cuculloides (R. Felder, 1874)
Capusa graodes Turner, 1919
Capusa leptoneura (Turner, 1926)
Capusa senilis Walker, 1857
Capusa stenophara Turner, 1919
Chlenias banksiaria (Le Guillou, 1841)
Chlenias basichorda Turner, 1919
Chlenias belophora (Turner, 1919)
Chlenias cyclosticha Lower, 1915
Chlenias gonosema Lower, 1893
Chlenias inkata Tindale, 1961
Chlenias macrochorda Turner, 1919
Chlenias nodosus (Swinhoe, 1892)
Chlenias ochrocrana Turner, 1947
Chlenias pini Tindale, 1929
Chlenias seminigra Rosenstock, 1885
Chlenias serina Lower, 1900
Chlenias stenosticha Turner, 1919
Chlenias zonaea Guest, 1887
Chlenomorpha lygdina (Turner, 1917)
Chlenomorpha sciogramma Lower, 1918
Chlenomorpha trisyneura (Lower, 1903)
Ciampa arietaria (Guenée, 1857)
Ciampa chordota (Meyrick, 1890)
Ciampa heteromorpha (Lower, 1901)
Ciampa melanostrepta (Lower, 1893)
Conosara castanea Meyrick, 1892
Conosara pammicta Turner, 1919
Corula geometroides Walker, 1856
Cryphaea xylina (Turner, 1917)
Crypsiphila atmophanes Turner, 1947
Cycloprorodes melanoxysta (Meyrick, 1892)
Drymoptila temenitis Guest, 1887
Dysbatus singularis Butler, 1886
Dysbatus stenodesma (Lower, 1899)
Epicompsa xanthocrossa Guest, 1887
Fisera belidearia (R. Felder & Rogenhofer, 1875)
Fisera bradymorpha Turner, 1919
Fisera dictyodes (Lower, 1893)
Fisera eribola (Guest, 1887)
Fisera halurga Turner, 1919
Fisera hypoleuca (Turner, 1919)
Fisera nicholsoni Goldfinch, 1944
Fisera perplexata Walker, 1860
Fisera phricotypa Turner, 1919
Gastrina cristaria Guenée, 1857
Gastrinopa xylistis Lower, 1903
Harpagocnema eremoplana Turner, 1915
Hypsitropha euschema Turner, 1926
Larophylla amimeta Turner, 1917
Liometopa rectilinea Turner, 1947
Lophosigna catasticta (Turner, 1904)
Lophosticha idiograpta (Turner, 1947)
Lophosticha psorallodes Lower, 1902
Lophothalaina habrocosma (Lower, 1893)
Loweria callisarca (Lower, 1903)
Loweria capnosticta (Turner, 1919)
Loweria eurypsamma (Lower, 1915)
Loweria haplochroa (Lower, 1915)
Loweria heteropa (Lower, 1901)
Loweria melancroca (Turner, 1919)
Loweria philocosma (Lower, 1915)
Loweria platydesma (Lower, 1901)
Loweria stenoscia (Lower, 1915)
Loweria tephrochroa (Lower, 1903)
Lychnographa agaura Turner, 1917
Lychnographa heroica Turner, 1917
Lyelliana dryophila Turner, 1917
Lyelliana phaeochlora Turner, 1916
Megazancla cinerea Goldfinch, 1944
Melanodes anthracitaria Guenée, 1857
Mictodoca callipolia (Turner, 1926)
Mictodoca toxeuta Meyrick, 1892
Middletonia hemichroma (Turner, 1947)
Middletonia suavis Turner, 1947
Mnesampela arida McQuillan, 1985
Mnesampela athertonensis McQuillan, 1985
Mnesampela comarcha Guest, 1887
Mnesampela heliochrysa (Lower, 1893)
Mnesampela kunama McQuillan, 1985
Mnesampela lenaea Meyrick, 1892
Mnesampela privata (Guenée, 1857)
Mochlotona phasmatias Meyrick, 1892
Neoteristis paraphanes Meyrick, 1892
Niceteria macrocosma (Lower, 1899)
Nisista galearia (Guenée, 1857)
Nisista notodontaria Walker, 1860
Nisista serrata (Walker, 1857)
Nycterephes anthracica (Lower, 1905)
Nycterephes coracopa Turner, 1906
Palleopa innotata Walker, 1866
Paralaea beggaria (Guenée, 1857)
Paralaea ochrosoma (R. Felder & Rogenhofer, 1875)
Paralaea polysticha (Goldfinch, 1944)
Paralaea porphyrinaria (Guenée, 1857)
Paurocoma coniopa Lower, 1918
Paurocoma molybdina Lower, 1902
Philolochma celaenochroa Turner, 1914
Plesanemma altafucata McQuillan, 1984
Plesanemma fucata (R. Felder & Rogenhofer, 1875)
Plesiolaea maritima (Lower, 1897)
Plesiolaea promacha (Meyrick, 1892)
Prosotera metopora Turner, 1919
Rhynchopsota delogramma Lower, 1903
Rhynchopsota rhyncophora (Lower, 1893)
Smyriodes aplectaria Guenée, 1857
Smyriodes trigramma (Lower, 1892)
Stibaroma aphronesa (Lower, 1902)
Stibaroma melanotoxa Guest, 1887
Synzeuxis penthina Turner, 1919
Thalaina allochroa (Lower, 1902)
Thalaina angulosa Walker, 1865
Thalaina chionoptila (Turner, 1947)
Thalaina clara Walker, 1855
Thalaina inscripta Walker, 1855
Thalaina kimba McQuillan, 1981
Thalaina macfarlandi (Wilson, 1972)
Thalaina paronycha (Lower, 1900)
Thalaina selenaea (Doubleday, 1845)
Thalaina tetraclada (Lower, 1900)
Xylodryas leptoxantha (Turner, 1919)

The following species belong to the tribe Nacophorini, but have not been assigned to a genus yet. Given here is the original name given to the species when it was first described:
Cymatophora aspera Walker, 1865

Plutodini
Plutodes signifera Warren, 1896

Scardamiini
Aplochlora pisochroa (Turner, 1906)
Scardamia chrysolina Meyrick, 1892
Scardamia ithyzona Turner, 1919
Scardamia metallaria Guenée, 1857

Unplaced to tribe
Clepsiphron calycopis Turner, 1922
Coelocrossa drepanucha Turner, 1919
Coelocrossa hypocrocea Turner, 1919
Neritodes verrucata Guenée, 1857
Peridelias aprosita Turner, 1919
Picromorpha pyrrhopa (Lower, 1897)
Picrophylla hyleora Turner, 1922
Tessarotis rubrata Warren, 1903
Xenomusa metallica T.P. Lucas, 1891
Xenomusa monoda Meyrick, 1890

The following species belong to the subfamily Ennominae, but have not been assigned to a genus or tribe yet. Given here is the original name given to the species when it was first described:
Boarmia australasiaria Boisduval, 1832
Caberodes punctiferata Walker, 1863
Chlenias ombrophora Lower, 1894
Epione incaria Guenée, 1857
Speranza fastidiata Walker, 1862
Tephrosia infimaria Walker, 1863
Xenomusa tetramera Lower, 1894

Subfamily Geometrinae
Aeolochroma acanthina (Meyrick, 1888)
Aeolochroma hypochromaria (Guenée, 1857)
Aeolochroma melaleucae (Goldfinch, 1929)
Aeolochroma metarhodata (Walker, 1863)
Aeolochroma mniaria (Goldfinch, 1929)
Aeolochroma olivia (Goldfinch, 1943)
Aeolochroma pammiges (Turner, 1941)
Aeolochroma quadrilinea (T.P. Lucas, 1892)
Aeolochroma rhodochlora (Goldfinch, 1929)
Aeolochroma saturataria (Walker, 1866)
Aeolochroma subrubescens (Warren, 1896)
Aeolochroma turneri (T.P. Lucas, 1890)
Aeolochroma unitaria (Walker, 1860)
Aeolochroma viridicata (T.P. Lucas, 1890)
Agathia distributa T.P. Lucas, 1891
Agathia kuehni Warren, 1898
Agathia lycaenaria (Kollar, 1848)
Agathia ochrotypa Turner, 1922
Agathia pisina Butler, 1887
Agathia prasinaspis Meyrick, 1889
Agathiopsis basipuncta Warren, 1896
Agathiopsis maculata Warren, 1896
Alloeopage cinerea (Warren, 1896)
Anisozyga aphrias (Meyrick, 1889)
Anisozyga callisticta (Turner, 1904)
Anisozyga erotyla (Turner, 1910)
Anisozyga erymnodes (Turner, 1910)
Anisozyga fascinans (T.P. Lucas, 1894)
Anisozyga goniota (Lower, 1894)
Anisozyga insperata (Walker, 1861)
Anisozyga leptocosma L.B. Prout, 1933
Anisozyga lithocrossa (Meyrick, 1889)
Anisozyga metaspila (Walker, 1861)
Anisozyga pieroides (Walker, 1861)
Anisozyga speciosa (T.P. Lucas, 1890)
Anomogenes morphnopa Turner, 1932
Apodasmia rufonigraria (Walker, 1862)
Argyrocosma argosticta (Turner, 1904)
Austroterpna idiographa Goldfinch, 1929
Austroterpna paratorna (Meyrick, 1888)
Berta chrysolineata Walker, 1863
Cenochlora quieta (T.P. Lucas, 1892)
Chloeres citrolimbaria (Guenée, 1857)
Chloeres prasochroa Turner, 1931
Chlorocoma asemanta (Meyrick, 1888)
Chlorocoma assimilis (T.P. Lucas, 1888)
Chlorocoma cadmaria (Guenée, 1857)
Chlorocoma carenaria (Guenée, 1857)
Chlorocoma cyclosema Turner, 1941
Chlorocoma dichloraria (Guenée, 1857)
Chlorocoma externa (Walker, 1861)
Chlorocoma halochlora (Meyrick, 1888)
Chlorocoma ipomopsis (Lower, 1892)
Chlorocoma melocrossa (Meyrick, 1888)
Chlorocoma monocyma (Meyrick, 1888)
Chlorocoma neptunus (Butler, 1886)
Chlorocoma paraphylla (Lower, 1902)
Chlorocoma pediobates Turner, 1939
Chlorocoma periphracta (Turner, 1904)
Chlorocoma rhodocrossa (Turner, 1906)
Chlorocoma rhodoloma Turner, 1910
Chlorocoma rhodothrix Turner, 1922
Chlorocoma stereota (Meyrick, 1888)
Chlorocoma tachypora Turner, 1910
Chlorocoma tetraspila (Lower, 1901)
Chlorocoma vertumnaria (Guenée, 1857)
Chlorodes boisduvalaria (Le Guillou, 1841)
Chrysochloroma megaloptera (Lower, 1894)
Comibaena connata (Warren, 1898)
Comibaena inductaria (Guenée, 1857)
Comibaena mariae (T.P. Lucas, 1888)
Comostola cedilla L.B. Prout, 1934
Comostola chlorargyra (Walker, 1861)
Comostola haplophanes Turner, 1910
Comostola iodioides (T.P. Lucas, 1891)
Comostola laesaria (Walker, 1861)
Comostola leucomerata (Walker, 1866)
Comostola minutata (H. Druce, 1888)
Comostola nereidaria (Snellen, 1881)
Comostolopsis germana L.B. Prout, 1916
Cosmogonia decorata (Warren, 1896)
Crypsiphona amaura Meyrick, 1888
Crypsiphona melanosema Meyrick, 1888
Crypsiphona ocultaria (Donovan, 1805)
Cymatoplex halcyone (Meyrick, 1889)
Cymatoplex hypolichna Turner, 1910
Cymatoplex subpellucida Aurivillius, 1920
Cyneoterpna alpina Goldfinch, 1929
Cyneoterpna wilsoni (R. Felder & Rogenhofer, 1875)
Diplodesma celataria (Walker, 1866)
Dysphania numana (Cramer, 1779)
Epipristis oxycyma Meyrick, 1888
Epipristis oxyodonta L.B. Prout, 1934
Episothalma obscurata Warren, 1896
Eretmopus marinaria (Guenée, 1857)
Eucrostes disparata Walker, 1861
Eucyclodes buprestaria (Guenée, 1857)
Euloxia argocnemis (Meyrick, 1888)
Euloxia beryllina (Meyrick, 1888)
Euloxia fugitivaria (Guenée, 1857)
Euloxia hypsithrona (Meyrick, 1888)
Euloxia isadelpha Turner, 1910
Euloxia leucochorda (Meyrick, 1888)
Euloxia meandraria (Guenée, 1857)
Euloxia meracula Turner, 1942
Euloxia ochthaula (Meyrick, 1888)
Euloxia pyropa (Meyrick, 1888)
Gelasma angulata (T.P. Lucas, 1888)
Gelasma calaina (Turner, 1910)
Gelasma centrophylla (Meyrick, 1888)
Gelasma multitincta (T.P. Lucas, 1891)
Gelasma orthodesma (Lower, 1894)
Gelasma selenosema Turner, 1941
Heliomystis electrica Meyrick, 1888
Hemichloreis exoterica (Meyrick, 1888)
Hemithea doddi L.B. Prout, 1933
Hemithea pellucidula (Turner, 1906)
Hemithea wuka (Pagenstecher, 1886)
Hypobapta barnardi Goldfinch, 1929
Hypobapta diffundens (T.P. Lucas, 1891)
Hypobapta percomptaria (Guenée, 1857)
Hypobapta xenomorpha (Lower, 1915)
Hypodoxa bryophylla (Goldfinch, 1929)
Hypodoxa calliglauca (Turner, 1926)
Hypodoxa conspurcata (T.P. Lucas, 1898)
Hypodoxa deteriorata (Walker, 1860)
Hypodoxa emiliaria (Guenée, 1857)
Hypodoxa erebusata (Walker, 1860)
Hypodoxa horridata (Walker, 1863)
Hypodoxa multicolor (Warren, 1899)
Hypodoxa muscosaria (Guenée, 1857)
Hypodoxa paroptila (Turner, 1906)
Idiochroa celidota Turner, 1922
Idiochroa demissa Turner, 1922
Idiochroa rufifrons Turner, 1941
Iulops argocrana (Meyrick, 1888)
Leucesthes alba (Swinhoe, 1902)
Lophothorax eremnopis (Turner, 1922)
Maxates coelataria (Walker, 1861)
Maxates tanygona (Turner, 1904)
Metallochlora ametalla Turner, 1910
Metallochlora lineata Warren, 1896
Metallochlora militaris (T.P. Lucas, 1891)
Metallochlora neomela (Meyrick, 1889)
Metallochlora venusta (Warren, 1896)
Metallothea eucrostes L.B. Prout, 1916
Mixocera latilineata (Walker, 1866)
Mixochroa gratiosata (Guenée, 1857)
Neothela cissochroa Turner, 1910
Oenochlora imperialis Warren, 1896
Oenospila flavifusata (Walker, 1861)
Oxyphanes thiobapta Turner, 1936
Pamphlebia rubrolimbraria (Guenée, 1857)
Paraterpna harrisoni Goldfinch, 1929
Pingasa angulifera Warren, 1896
Pingasa blanda (Pagenstecher, 1900)
Pingasa chlora (Stoll, 1782)
Pingasa cinerea Warren, 1894
Pingasa nobilis L.B. Prout, 1913
Prasinocyma albicosta (Walker, 1861)
Prasinocyma caniola (Warren, 1903)
Prasinocyma crossota (Meyrick, 1888)
Prasinocyma flavicosta (Warren, 1897)
Prasinocyma floresaria (Walker, 1866)
Prasinocyma gracilis (T.P. Lucas, 1888)
Prasinocyma iosticta (Meyrick, 1888)
Prasinocyma lychnopasta Turner, 1915
Prasinocyma ocyptera (Meyrick, 1888)
Prasinocyma rhodocosma (Meyrick, 1888)
Prasinocyma semicrocea (Walker, 1861)
Protophyta benigna Turner, 1939
Protophyta castanea (Lower, 1898)
Pyrrhorachis cornuta Warren, 1896
Pyrrhorachis pyrrhogona (Walker, 1866)
Rhuma subaurata Walker, 1860
Sterictopsis argyraspis (Lower, 1893)
Sterictopsis divergens Goldfinch, 1929
Sterictopsis inconsequens Warren, 1898
Thalassodes byrsopis Meyrick, 1886
Thalassodes dorsilinea Warren, 1903
Thalassodes pilaria Guenée, 1857
Thalassodes rhytiphorus (Lower, 1893)
Thalassodes veraria Guenée, 1857
Uliocnemis biplagiata (Moore, 1887)
Uliocnemis partita (Walker, 1861)
Urolitha bipunctifera (Walker, 1861)
Xenochlaena porphyropa (Lower, 1898)

The following species belong to the subfamily Geometrinae, but have not been assigned to a genus yet. Given here is the original name given to the species when it was first described:
Cerura melanoglypta Lower, 1905
Iodis nitida T.P. Lucas, 1892

Subfamily Larentiinae

Asthenini
Chaetolopha decipiens (Butler, 1886)
Chaetolopha emporias (Turner, 1904)
Chaetolopha leucophragma (Meyrick, 1891)
Chaetolopha niphosticha (Turner, 1907)
Chaetolopha oxyntis (Meyrick, 1891)
Cretheis atrostrigata (Warren, 1894)
Cretheis cymatodes Meyrick, 1886
Epicyme rubropunctaria (Doubleday, 1843)
Minoa aedaea (Turner, 1926)
Minoa euthecta (Turner, 1904)
Poecilasthena anthodes (Meyrick, 1891)
Poecilasthena balioloma (Turner, 1907)
Poecilasthena cisseres Turner, 1933
Poecilasthena euphylla (Meyrick, 1891)
Poecilasthena fragilis Turner, 1942
Poecilasthena glaucosa (T.P. Lucas, 1888)
Poecilasthena iopolia (Turner, 1926)
Poecilasthena ischnophrica Turner, 1941
Poecilasthena oceanias (Meyrick, 1891)
Poecilasthena panapala Turner, 1922
Poecilasthena phaeodryas Turner, 1931
Poecilasthena pisicolor Turner, 1942
Poecilasthena pulchraria (Doubleday, 1843)
Poecilasthena scoliota (Meyrick, 1891)
Poecilasthena sthenommata Turner, 1922
Poecilasthena thalassias (Meyrick, 1891)
Poecilasthena urarcha (Meyrick, 1891)
Poecilasthena xylocyma (Meyrick, 1891)

Chesiadini
Aplocera efformata (Guenée, 1857)
Aplocera plagiata (Linnaeus, 1758)

Eupitheciini
Aepylopha thalassia Turner, 1942
Antimimistis illaudata Turner, 1922
Chloroclystis ablechra Turner, 1904
Chloroclystis alpnista Turner, 1907
Chloroclystis approximata (Walker, 1869)
Chloroclystis athaumasta Turner, 1908
Chloroclystis bryodes Turner, 1907
Chloroclystis catastreptes (Meyrick, 1891)
Chloroclystis celidota Turner, 1931
Chloroclystis cissocosma Turner, 1904
Chloroclystis delosticha Turner, 1942
Chloroclystis elaeopa Turner, 1908
Chloroclystis embolocosma Turner, 1936
Chloroclystis epilopha Turner, 1907
Chloroclystis filata (Guenée, 1857)
Chloroclystis gonias Turner, 1904
Chloroclystis guttifera Turner, 1904
Chloroclystis insigillata (Walker, 1862)
Chloroclystis metallospora Turner, 1904
Chloroclystis mniochroa Turner, 1904
Chloroclystis nigrilineata Warren, 1898
Chloroclystis pallidiplaga (Warren, 1898)
Chloroclystis pauxillula Turner, 1907
Chloroclystis perissa Turner, 1908
Chloroclystis phoenochyta Turner, 1922
Chloroclystis plinthochyta Turner, 1931
Chloroclystis poliophrica Turner, 1922
Chloroclystis pyrrholopha Turner, 1907
Chloroclystis pyrsodonta Turner, 1922
Chloroclystis stenophrica Turner, 1931
Chloroclystis testulata (Guenée, 1857)
Collix ghosha Walker, 1862
Collix multifilata Warren, 1896
Eriopithex recensitaria (Walker, 1862)
Gymnoscelis acidna Turner, 1904
Gymnoscelis aenictopa Turner, 1907
Gymnoscelis callichlora Turner, 1907
Gymnoscelis celaenephes Turner, 1907
Gymnoscelis chlorobapta Turner, 1907
Gymnoscelis coquina Warren, 1897
Gymnoscelis delocyma Turner, 1904
Gymnoscelis erymna (Meyrick, 1886)
Gymnoscelis holocapna Turner, 1922
Gymnoscelis ischnophylla Turner, 1942
Gymnoscelis kennii Turner, 1922
Gymnoscelis lophopus Turner, 1904
Gymnoscelis mesophoena Turner, 1907
Gymnoscelis minima (Warren, 1897)
Gymnoscelis perpusilla Turner, 1942
Gymnoscelis polyclealis (Walker, 1859)
Gymnoscelis spodias Turner, 1922
Gymnoscelis subrufata Warren, 1898
Gymnoscelis tanaoptila Turner, 1907
Gymnoscelis tristrigosa (Butler, 1880)
Horisme mortuata (Guenée, 1857)
Horisme plagiographa Turner, 1922
Horisme xylinata (Warren, 1906)
Mesoptila compsodes Meyrick, 1891
Microdes arcuata Swinhoe, 1902
Microdes asystata Turner, 1922
Microdes decora Turner, 1942
Microdes diplodonta Turner, 1904
Microdes haemobaphes Turner, 1926
Microdes leptobrya Turner, 1939
Microdes melanocausta Meyrick, 1891
Microdes oriochares Turner, 1922
Microdes squamulata Guenée, 1857
Microdes typhopa Lower, 1897
Microdes villosata Guenée, 1857
Micrulia tenuilinea Warren, 1896
Mnesiloba eupitheciata (Walker, 1863)
Phrissogonus laticostata (Walker, 1862)
Symmimetis muscosa Turner, 1907
Symmimetis sylvatica Turner, 1922
Tephroclystia aphanes Turner, 1941
Tephroclystia melanolopha (Swinhoe, 1895)
Tephroclystia planiscripta Warren, 1902
Tephroclystia tornolopha Turner, 1942
Ziridava rufinigra Swinhoe, 1895
Ziridava xylinaria Walker, 1863

Hydriomenini
Anachloris subochraria (Doubleday, 1843)
Anachloris uncinata (Guenée, 1857)
Anomocentris capnoxutha Turner, 1939
Anomocentris cosmadelpha (Lower, 1901)
Anomocentris crystallota Meyrick, 1891
Anomocentris trissodesma (Lower, 1897)
Aponotoreas cheimatobiata (Guenée, 1857)
Aponotoreas dascia (Turner, 1904)
Aponotoreas epicrossa (Meyrick, 1891)
Aponotoreas petrodes (Turner, 1904)
Larentia aganopis Turner, 1922
Larentia apotoma (Turner, 1907)
Larentia assimilata (Walker, 1862)
Larentia oribates Turner, 1922
Larentia tenuis Turner, 1931
Melitulias discophora Meyrick, 1891
Melitulias glandulata (Guenée, 1857)
Melitulias graphicata (Walker, 1861)
Melitulias leucographa Turner, 1922
Melitulias oriadelpha Turner, 1926
Notoreas aethalopa Turner, 1907

Trichopterygini
Episteira protima (Turner, 1907)
Sauris brevipalpis Dugdale, 1980
Sauris cirrhigera (Warren, 1897)
Sauris commoni Dugdale, 1980
Sauris dentatilinea (Warren, 1905)
Sauris lichenias (Meyrick, 1891)
Sauris malaca (Meyrick, 1891)
Sauris melanoceros (Meyrick, 1889)
Sauris melanosterna Dugdale, 1980
Sauris nebulosa Dugdale, 1980
Sauris plumipes Dugdale, 1980
Sauris rectilineata Dugdale, 1980
Sauris vetustata Walker, 1866
Tympanota perophora (Turner, 1922)

Xanthorhoini
Acodia chytrodes (Turner, 1926)
Acodia orina (Turner, 1926)
Acodia pauper Rosenstock, 1885
Austrocidaria erasta (Turner, 1939)
Chrysolarentia actinipha (Lower, 1902)
Chrysolarentia adornata (Guenée, 1857)
Chrysolarentia aglaodes (Meyrick, 1891)
Chrysolarentia aprepta (Turner, 1922)
Chrysolarentia arachnitis (Turner, 1904)
Chrysolarentia argocyma (Turner, 1904)
Chrysolarentia bertha (Swinhoe, 1902)
Chrysolarentia bichromata (Guenée, 1857)
Chrysolarentia caesia (Turner, 1904)
Chrysolarentia callima (Turner, 1904)
Chrysolarentia cataphaea (Meyrick, 1891)
Chrysolarentia chrysocyma (Meyrick, 1891)
Chrysolarentia cnephaeopa (Turner, 1926)
Chrysolarentia conifasciata Butler, 1882
Chrysolarentia coniophylla (Turner, 1922)
Chrysolarentia crocota (Turner, 1904)
Chrysolarentia cryeropa (Meyrick, 1891)
Chrysolarentia cydalima (Turner, 1907)
Chrysolarentia decisaria (Walker, 1863)
Chrysolarentia doliopis (Meyrick, 1891)
Chrysolarentia epicteta (Turner, 1908)
Chrysolarentia euclidiata (Guenée, 1857)
Chrysolarentia euphileta (Turner, 1907)
Chrysolarentia eustropha (Turner, 1926)
Chrysolarentia gypsomela (Lower, 1892)
Chrysolarentia hedylepta (Turner, 1904)
Chrysolarentia heliacaria (Guenée, 1857)
Chrysolarentia heteroleuca (Meyrick, 1891)
Chrysolarentia heterotropa Turner, 1926
Chrysolarentia hilaodes (Turner, 1926)
Chrysolarentia imperviata (Walker, 1862)
Chrysolarentia inangulata (Bastelberger, 1908)
Chrysolarentia insulsata (Guenée, 1857)
Chrysolarentia interruptata (Guenée, 1857)
Chrysolarentia leptophrica (Turner, 1922)
Chrysolarentia leucophanes (Meyrick, 1891)
Chrysolarentia leucozona (Meyrick, 1891)
Chrysolarentia loxocyma (Turner, 1904)
Chrysolarentia lucidulata (Walker, 1862)
Chrysolarentia mecynata (Guenée, 1857)
Chrysolarentia melanchlaena (Turner, 1922)
Chrysolarentia microcyma (Guest, 1887)
Chrysolarentia nephodes (Meyrick, 1891)
Chrysolarentia opipara (Turner, 1907)
Chrysolarentia orthropis (Meyrick, 1891)
Chrysolarentia oxygona (Meyrick, 1891)
Chrysolarentia oxyodonta (Turner, 1922)
Chrysolarentia panochra (Turner, 1922)
Chrysolarentia pantoea (Turner, 1908)
Chrysolarentia perialla (Turner, 1922)
Chrysolarentia pericalles (Turner, 1922)
Chrysolarentia perornata (Walker, 1862)
Chrysolarentia persimilis (Turner, 1926)
Chrysolarentia phaedra (Meyrick, 1891)
Chrysolarentia phaeoxutha (Turner, 1926)
Chrysolarentia phaulophanes (Turner, 1936)
Chrysolarentia photographica (Turner, 1939)
Chrysolarentia plagiocausta (Turner, 1904)
Chrysolarentia plesia (Turner, 1904)
Chrysolarentia poliophasma (Turner, 1922)
Chrysolarentia polycarpa (Meyrick, 1891)
Chrysolarentia polyxantha (Meyrick, 1891)
Chrysolarentia psarodes (Turner, 1904)
Chrysolarentia ptochopis (Turner, 1907)
Chrysolarentia rhynchota (Meyrick, 1891)
Chrysolarentia severata (Guenée, 1857)
Chrysolarentia squamulata (Warren, 1899)
Chrysolarentia stereozona (Meyrick, 1891)
Chrysolarentia subrectaria (Guenée, 1857)
Chrysolarentia symphona (Meyrick, 1891)
Chrysolarentia synchora (Meyrick, 1891)
Chrysolarentia tacera (Turner, 1922)
Chrysolarentia tasmanica (Turner, 1926)
Chrysolarentia tristis (Butler, 1882)
Chrysolarentia trygodes (Meyrick, 1891)
Chrysolarentia vicissata (Guenée, 1857)
Epyaxa agelasta (Turner, 1904)
Epyaxa centroneura (Meyrick, 1891)
Epyaxa epia (Turner, 1922)
Epyaxa hyperythra (Lower, 1892)
Epyaxa metoporina (Turner, 1922)
Epyaxa pyrrhobaphes (Turner, 1926)
Epyaxa sodaliata (Walker, 1862)
Epyaxa subidaria (Guenée, 1857)
Visiana brujata (Guenée, 1857)
Visiana excentrata (Guenée, 1857)
Xanthorhoe anaspila Meyrick, 1891
Xanthorhoe anthracinata (Guenée, 1857)
Xanthorhoe argodesma Meyrick, 1891
Xanthorhoe emmelopis Turner, 1941
Xanthorhoe hypogramma Lower, 1903
Xanthorhoe pentodonta (Lower, 1915)
Xanthorhoe percrassata (Walker, 1862)
Xanthorhoe propinqua (Turner, 1936)
Xanthorhoe rhodacris Lower, 1902
Xanthorhoe strumosata (Guenée, 1857)
Xanthorhoe vacuaria (Guenée, 1857)
Xanthorhoe xanthospila Lower, 1892
Xanthorhoe xerodes Meyrick, 1891

Unplaced to tribe
Cleptocosmia mutabilis Warren, 1896
Crasilogia gressitti Holloway, 1984
Eccymatoge aorista (Turner, 1907)
Eccymatoge callizona (Lower, 1894)
Eccymatoge fulvida Turner, 1907
Eccymatoge morphna Turner, 1922
Ecnomophlebia argyrospila Turner, 1941
Eremodorea haplopsara Turner, 1939
Eucymatoge scotodes Turner, 1904
Heterochasta conglobata (Walker, 1862)
Heterochasta lasioplaca Lower, 1897
Hypycnopa delotis Lower, 1903
Papuanticlea horia (L.B. Prout, 1939)
Polyclysta hypogrammata Guenée, 1857
Scotocyma albinotata (Walker, 1866)
Scotocyma euryochra Turner, 1922
Scotocyma idioschema Turner, 1922
Scotocyma ischnophrica Turner, 1932
Scotocyma pteridophila (Turner, 1907)
Scotocyma transfixa Turner, 1931

Oenochrominae
Adeixis inostentata (Walker, 1861)
Aglossophanes adoxima Turner, 1942
Aglossophanes pachygramma (Lower, 1893)
Antasia flavicapitata (Guenée, 1857)
Antictenia punctunculus (T.P. Lucas, 1892)
Antictenia torta L.B. Prout, 1921
Apotheta tanymita Turner, 1931
Arcina fulgorigera Walker, 1863
Arhodia lasiocamparia Guenée, 1857
Axiagasta rhodobaphes Turner, 1930
Cathaemacta loxomochla Turner, 1929
Cathaemacta thermistis (Lower, 1894)
Celerena griseofusa Warren, 1896
Cernia amyclaria Walker, 1860
Circopetes obtusata (Walker, 1860)
Derambila catharina L.B. Prout, 1910
Derambila idiosceles Turner, 1930
Derambila liosceles Turner, 1930
Derambila permensata (Walker, 1863)
Dichromodes aesia Turner, 1930
Dichromodes ainaria Guenée, 1857
Dichromodes anelictis Meyrick, 1890
Dichromodes angasi (R. Felder & Rogenhofer, 1875)
Dichromodes aristadelpha Lower, 1903
Dichromodes atrosignata (Walker, 1861)
Dichromodes berthoudi L.B. Prout, 1910
Dichromodes capnoporphyra Turner, 1939
Dichromodes cirrhoplaca Lower, 1915
Dichromodes compsotis Meyrick, 1890
Dichromodes confluaria (Guenée, 1857)
Dichromodes consignata (Walker, 1861)
Dichromodes denticulata Turner, 1930
Dichromodes diffusaria (Guenée, 1857)
Dichromodes disputata (Walker, 1861)
Dichromodes emplecta Turner, 1930
Dichromodes estigmaria (Walker, 1861)
Dichromodes euprepes L.B. Prout, 1910
Dichromodes euscia Meyrick, 1890
Dichromodes explanata (Walker, 1861)
Dichromodes exsignata (Walker, 1861)
Dichromodes fulvida Lower, 1915
Dichromodes galactica Turner, 1930
Dichromodes haematopa Turner, 1906
Dichromodes icelodes Turner, 1930
Dichromodes indicataria (Walker, 1866)
Dichromodes ioneura Meyrick, 1890
Dichromodes ischnota Meyrick, 1890
Dichromodes lechria Turner, 1943
Dichromodes leptogramma Turner, 1930
Dichromodes leptozona Turner, 1930
Dichromodes limosa Turner, 1930
Dichromodes lissophrica Turner, 1930
Dichromodes longidens L.B. Prout, 1910
Dichromodes loxotropha Turner, 1943
Dichromodes lygrodes Turner, 1930
Dichromodes mesodonta Turner, 1930
Dichromodes mesogonia L.B. Prout, 1910
Dichromodes mesoporphyra Turner, 1939
Dichromodes mesotoma Turner, 1943
Dichromodes mesozona L.B. Prout, 1910
Dichromodes molybdaria (Guenée, 1857)
Dichromodes obtusata (Walker, 1861)
Dichromodes orectis Meyrick, 1890
Dichromodes oriphoetes Turner, 1930
Dichromodes ornata (Walker, 1861)
Dichromodes orthotis Meyrick, 1890
Dichromodes orthozona Lower, 1903
Dichromodes paratacta Meyrick, 1890
Dichromodes partitaria (Walker, 1866)
Dichromodes personalis (R. Felder & Rogenhofer, 1874)
Dichromodes phaeoxesta Turner, 1939
Dichromodes poecilotis Meyrick, 1890
Dichromodes raynori L.B. Prout, 1920
Dichromodes rimosa L.B. Prout, 1910
Dichromodes rostrata Turner, 1930
Dichromodes rufilinea Turner, 1939
Dichromodes rufula L.B. Prout, 1910
Dichromodes scothima L.B. Prout, 1910
Dichromodes semicanescens L.B. Prout, 1913
Dichromodes sigmata (Walker, 1861)
Dichromodes stilbiata (Guenée, 1857)
Dichromodes subrufa Turner, 1939
Dichromodes triparata (Walker, 1861)
Dichromodes typhistis Turner, 1939
Dichromodes uniformis Bastelberger, 1907
Dichromodes usurpatrix L.B. Prout, 1910
Dinophalus ampycteria (Turner, 1930)
Dinophalus atmoscia (Meyrick, 1890)
Dinophalus bathrosema (L.B. Prout, 1911)
Dinophalus bicorne (Aurivillius, 1920)
Dinophalus cyanorrhoea (Lower, 1903)
Dinophalus drakei (L.B. Prout, 1910)
Dinophalus eremoea (Lower, 1907)
Dinophalus hiracopis (Meyrick, 1890)
Dinophalus idiocrana Turner, 1930
Dinophalus incongrua (Walker, 1857)
Dinophalus lechriomita Turner, 1930
Dinophalus macrophyes (L.B. Prout, 1910)
Dinophalus oxystoma (Turner, 1939)
Dinophalus serpentaria (Guenée, 1864)
Dinophalus thrasyschema (Turner, 1939)
Ecphyas holopsara Turner, 1929
Enchocrana lacista Turner, 1930
Encryphia frontisignata (Walker, 1863)
Epidesmia brachygrammella Lower, 1893
Epidesmia chilonaria (Herrich-Schäffer, 1855)
Epidesmia hypenaria (Guenée, 1857)
Epidesmia oxyderces Meyrick, 1890
Epidesmia perfabricata (Walker, 1861)
Epidesmia phoenicina Turner, 1929
Epidesmia reservata (Walker, 1861)
Epidesmia tricolor Duncan & Westwood, 1841
Epidesmia tryxaria (Guenée, 1857)
Eumelea duponchelii (Montrouzier, 1856)
Eumelea rosalia (Stoll, 1781)
Eumelea stipata Turner, 1930
Gastrophora henricaria Guenée, 1857
Homospora rhodoscopa (Lower, 1902)
Hypographa aristarcha L.B. Prout, 1910
Hypographa epiodes Turner, 1930
Hypographa phlegetonaria Guenée, 1857
Hypographa reflua T.P. Lucas, 1898
Lissomma dilutaria (Warren, 1903)
Lissomma himerata Warren, 1905
Lissomma minuta (Swinhoe, 1902)
Lissomma postcarneata (L.B. Prout, 1910)
Monoctenia falernaria Guenée, 1857
Monoctenia smerintharia R. Felder & Rogenhofer, 1875
Nearcha aridaria (Walker, 1866)
Nearcha atyla Meyrick, 1890
Nearcha benecristata Warren, 1895
Nearcha buffalaria (Guenée, 1857)
Nearcha caronia Swinhoe, 1902
Nearcha curtaria (Guenée, 1857)
Nearcha dasyzona (Lower, 1903)
Nearcha nullata (Guenée, 1857)
Nearcha ophla Swinhoe, 1902
Nearcha pseudophaes Lower, 1893
Nearcha staurotis Meyrick, 1890
Nearcha tristificata (Walker, 1861)
Nearcha ursaria (Guenée, 1857)
Noreia vinacea Warren, 1899
Nycticleptes lechriodesma Turner, 1939
Oenochroma alpina Turner, 1930
Oenochroma celidophora Turner, 1939
Oenochroma cerasiplaga Warren, 1914
Oenochroma cycnoptera (Lower, 1894)
Oenochroma decolorata Warren, 1896
Oenochroma infantilis L.B. Prout, 1910
Oenochroma lissoscia Turner, 1922
Oenochroma ochripennata (Walker, 1860)
Oenochroma orthodesma (Lower, 1894)
Oenochroma pallida Warren, 1898
Oenochroma phyllomorpha (Lower, 1899)
Oenochroma polyspila (Lower, 1897)
Oenochroma privata (Walker, 1860)
Oenochroma quardrigramma (T.P. Lucas, 1900)
Oenochroma subustaria (Walker, 1860)
Oenochroma turneri (T.P. Lucas, 1892)
Oenochroma vetustaria (Walker, 1860)
Oenochroma vinaria Guenée, 1857
Omoplatica holopolia Turner, 1926
Onycodes rubra (T.P. Lucas, 1892)
Onycodes traumataria Guenée, 1857
Ozola exigua Swinhoe, 1902
Ozola hollowayi Scoble & Sommerer, 1988
Parepisparis brevidactyla Scoble & E.D. Edwards, 1990
Parepisparis dumigani Scoble & E.D. Edwards, 1990
Parepisparis excusata (Walker, 1860)
Parepisparis lutosaria (R. Felder & Rogenhofer, 1875)
Parepisparis multicolora (T.P. Lucas, 1892)
Parepisparis pallidus Scoble & E.D. Edwards, 1990
Parepisparis rutila (Turner, 1947)
Parepisparis virgatus Scoble & E.D. Edwards, 1990
Phallaria ophiusaria Guenée, 1857
Phrataria bijugata (Walker, 1863)
Phrataria replicataria Walker, 1866
Phrataria transcissata Walker, 1863
Phrataria v-album Turner, 1944
Phrixocomes gephyrea Turner, 1936
Phrixocomes hedrasticha Turner, 1936
Phrixocomes nexistriga (L.B. Prout, 1910)
Phrixocomes ophiucha (Meyrick, 1890)
Phrixocomes ptilomacra (Lower, 1892)
Phrixocomes steropias (Meyrick, 1890)
Physetostege miranda Warren, 1896
Sarcinodes holzi Pagenstecher, 1888
Symphylistis leptocyma Turner, 1930
Systatica xanthastis (Lower, 1894)
Tapinogyna oxypeuces Turner, 1933
Tapinogyna perichroa (Lower, 1903)
Taxeotis acrothecta Turner, 1904
Taxeotis adelia L.B. Prout, 1910
Taxeotis adelpha Turner, 1904
Taxeotis aenigmatodes Turner, 1929
Taxeotis alloceros Turner, 1929
Taxeotis anthracopa Meyrick, 1890
Taxeotis bigeminata L.B. Prout, 1910
Taxeotis blechra Turner, 1929
Taxeotis celidora Turner, 1939
Taxeotis compar Turner, 1929
Taxeotis didymosticha Turner, 1939
Taxeotis egenata (Walker, 1861)
Taxeotis endela Meyrick, 1890
Taxeotis epigaea Turner, 1904
Taxeotis epigypsa Meyrick, 1890
Taxeotis eremophila Turner, 1929
Taxeotis euryzona Turner, 1936
Taxeotis eutyctodes Turner, 1939
Taxeotis exaereta Turner, 1929
Taxeotis exsectaria (Walker, 1861)
Taxeotis goniogramma Meyrick, 1897
Taxeotis helicta Turner, 1939
Taxeotis holoscia Lower, 1903
Taxeotis homoeopa Turner, 1944
Taxeotis intermixtaria (Walker, 1861)
Taxeotis intextata (Guenée, 1857)
Taxeotis isomeris Meyrick, 1890
Taxeotis lechrioschema Turner, 1939
Taxeotis limbosa Turner, 1933
Taxeotis lygrophanes (Turner, 1943)
Taxeotis maerens Turner, 1939
Taxeotis mimela L.B. Prout, 1910
Taxeotis notosticta Turner, 1936
Taxeotis ochrosticta Turner, 1929
Taxeotis oraula Meyrick, 1890
Taxeotis orphnina Turner, 1904
Taxeotis perlinearia (Walker, 1861)
Taxeotis phaeopa Lower, 1899
Taxeotis philodora Meyrick, 1890
Taxeotis phricocyma Turner, 1929
Taxeotis pleurostigma Turner, 1943
Taxeotis pychnomochla Turner, 1939
Taxeotis reserata (Walker, 1860)
Taxeotis spodoides Turner, 1943
Taxeotis stereospila Meyrick, 1890
Taxeotis thegalea Turner, 1939
Taxeotis xanthogramma Lower, 1903
Thaumatographe singularis Warren, 1907
Zeuctophlebia squalidata (Walker, 1863)
Zeuctophlebia tapinodes Turner, 1904

Subfamily Sterrhinae
Anisodes ampligutta (Warren, 1896)
Anisodes compacta (Warren, 1898)
Anisodes flavirubra (Warren, 1896)
Anisodes flavispila (Warren, 1896)
Anisodes frenaria Guenée, 1857
Anisodes griseata (Warren, 1896)
Anisodes jocosa (Warren, 1896)
Anisodes lechriostropha Turner, 1941
Anisodes leptopasta Turner, 1908
Anisodes longidiscata (Warren, 1904)
Anisodes minorata (Warren, 1897)
Anisodes monetaria Guenée, 1857
Anisodes niveopuncta (Warren, 1897)
Anisodes obliviaria Walker, 1861
Anisodes obstataria (Walker, 1861)
Anisodes perpunctulata L.B. Prout, 1938
Anisodes porphyropis (Meyrick, 1888)
Anisodes praetermissa (Bastelberger, 1908)
Anisodes punctata (Warren, 1897)
Anisodes recusataria (Walker, 1863)
Anisodes rhodobapta Turner, 1941
Anisodes sciota Turner, 1908
Anisodes sordidata (Warren, 1896)
Anisodes sticta (Turner, 1941)
Anisodes turneri Prout, 1920
Antitrygodes parvimacula Warren, 1896
Autanepsia poliodesma Turner, 1908
Chorizomena nivosa Turner, 1939
Chrysocraspeda aurimargo Warren, 1897
Chrysocraspeda cruoraria (Warren, 1897)
Chrysocraspeda eumeles Turner, 1936
Chrysocraspeda leucotoca L.B. Prout, 1938
Dasybela achroa (Lower, 1902)
Dasybela argillina (Lower, 1915)
Dithalama cosmospila Meyrick, 1888
Dithalama desueta (Warren, 1902)
Dithalama persalsa (Warren, 1902)
Dithalama punctilinea (Swinhoe, 1902)
Gnamptoloma aventiaria (Guenée, 1857)
Gnamptoloma rubra Holloway, 1979
Idaea alopecodes (Meyrick, 1888)
Idaea argophylla (Turner, 1922)
Idaea chloristis (Meyrick, 1888)
Idaea coercita (T.P. Lucas, 1900)
Idaea costaria (Walker, 1863)
Idaea crinipes (Warren, 1897)
Idaea dasypus (Turner, 1908)
Idaea delosticta (Turner, 1922)
Idaea dolichopis (Turner, 1908)
Idaea elachista (Turner, 1922)
Idaea elaphrodes (Turner, 1908)
Idaea epicyrta (Turner, 1917)
Idaea eretmopus (Turner, 1908)
Idaea euclasta (Turner, 1922)
Idaea eucrossa (Turner, 1932)
Idaea ferrilinea (Warren, 1900)
Idaea franconiaria (Swinhoe, 1902)
Idaea fucosa (Warren, 1900)
Idaea halmaea (Meyrick, 1888)
Idaea inversata (Guenée, 1857)
Idaea iodesma (Meyrick, 1897)
Idaea leptochyta (Turner, 1942)
Idaea lucida (Turner, 1942)
Idaea miltophrica (Turner, 1922)
Idaea nanata (Warren, 1897)
Idaea nephelota (Turner, 1908)
Idaea pachydetis (Meyrick, 1888)
Idaea partita (T.P. Lucas, 1900)
Idaea philocosma (Meyrick, 1888)
Idaea pilosata (Warren, 1898)
Idaea probleta (Turner, 1908)
Idaea pseliota (Meyrick, 1888)
Idaea punctatissima (Warren, 1901)
Idaea rhopalopus (Turner, 1908)
Idaea scaura (Turner, 1922)
Idaea scintillans (Warren, 1898)
Idaea simplex (Warren, 1899)
Idaea stenozona (Lower, 1902)
Idaea trissomita (Turner, 1941)
Idaea trissorma (Turner, 1926)
Idaea trypheropa (Meyrick, 1889)
Idaea uniformis (Warren, 1896)
Idaea zonata (L.B. Prout, 1932)
Notiosterrha aglaodesma (Lower, 1893)
Notiosterrha interalbulata (Warren, 1904)
Notiosterrha pulcherrima (Turner, 1939)
Notiosterrha rhodocosma (Lower, 1897)
Notiosterrha triglypta (Lower, 1908)
Organopoda olivescens Warren, 1896
Problepsis apollinaria (Guenée, 1857)
Problepsis clemens T.P. Lucas, 1890
Problepsis sancta Meyrick, 1888
Problepsis transposita Warren, 1903
Ptochophyle cyphosticha Turner, 1908
Scopula adeptaria (Walker, 1861)
Scopula agnes (Butler, 1886)
Scopula aleuritis (Turner, 1908)
Scopula amala (Meyrick, 1886)
Scopula axiotis (Meyrick, 1888)
Scopula caesaria (Walker, 1861)
Scopula castissima (Warren, 1897)
Scopula coenona (Turner, 1908)
Scopula desita (Walker, 1860)
Scopula despoliata (Walker, 1861)
Scopula didymosema (Lower, 1893)
Scopula emissaria (Walker, 1861)
Scopula episcia (Meyrick, 1888)
Scopula episticta Turner, 1942
Scopula erebospila (Lower, 1902)
Scopula hypocallista (Lower, 1900)
Scopula hypochra (Meyrick, 1888)
Scopula innocens (Butler, 1886)
Scopula isodesma (Lower, 1903)
Scopula lechrioloma (Turner, 1908)
Scopula liotis (Meyrick, 1888)
Scopula loxographa Turner, 1941
Scopula loxosema (Turner, 1908)
Scopula lydia (Butler, 1886)
Scopula megalocentra (Meyrick, 1888)
Scopula neoxesta (Meyrick, 1888)
Scopula oppilata (Walker, 1861)
Scopula optivata (Walker, 1861)
Scopula orthoscia (Meyrick, 1888)
Scopula perialurga (Turner, 1922)
Scopula perlata (Walker, 1861)
Scopula prosoeca (Turner, 1908)
Scopula rubraria (Doubleday, 1843)
Scopula subcandida L.B. Prout, 1938
Scopula sublinearia (Walker, 1866)
Scopula synethes (Turner, 1922)
Scopula thysanopus (Turner, 1908)
Somatina eurymitra Turner, 1926
Somatina microphylla (Meyrick, 1889)
Somatina rufifascia Warren, 1896
Somatina triocellata (Bastelberger, 1908)
Symmacra solidaria (Guenée, 1857)
Traminda mundissima (Walker, 1861)
Traminda prasodes (Meyrick, 1888)
Zygophyxia relictata (Walker, 1866)
Zythos aphrodite (L.B. Prout, 1932)

Further reading

External links 
Geometridae at the Australian Faunal Directory

Australia
Australia